David Edward Leslie Hemmings (18 November 1941 – 3 December 2003) was an English actor and director. He is best remembered for his roles in British films and television programmes of the 1960s and 1970s, particularly his lead role as a trendy fashion photographer in the hugely successful avant-garde mystery film Blowup (1966), directed by Michelangelo Antonioni. Early in his career, Hemmings was a boy soprano appearing in operatic roles. In 1967, he co-founded the Hemdale Film Corporation.  From the mid-1970s on, he worked mainly as a character actor and occasionally as director.

Early life
David Hemmings was born in Guildford, Surrey, to a biscuit salesman father.

Benjamin Britten
His education at Alleyn's School, Glyn Grammar School in Ewell, and the Arts Educational Schools led him to start his career performing as a boy soprano in several works by the composer Benjamin Britten, who formed a close friendship with him at this time. Most notably, Hemmings created the role of Miles in Britten's chamber opera Turn of the Screw (1954). His intimate, yet innocent, relationship with Britten is described in John Bridcut's book Britten's Children (2006).

Although many commentators identified Britten's relationship with Hemmings as based on an infatuation, throughout his life, Hemmings maintained categorically that Britten's conduct with him was beyond reproach at all times. Hemmings had earlier played the title role in Britten's The Little Sweep (1952), which was part of Britten's Let's Make an Opera! children's production.

Britten's interest in Hemmings ceased very abruptly, from the moment his voice broke, which occurred unexpectedly while singing the aria "Malo" during a performance of The Turn of the Screw in 1956 in Paris. Britten was furious, waved Hemmings away, and never had any further contact with him.

Acting

Child actor
Hemmings then moved on to acting in films. He made his first film appearance in the drama film The Rainbow Jacket (1954). He could also be seen in Saint Joan (1957).

Hemmings had bigger roles in Five Clues to Fortune (1957), The Heart Within (1957), and No Trees in the Street (1959), directed by J. Lee Thompson. He could also be seen in Men of Tomorrow (1959), In the Wake of a Stranger (1959), Sink the Bismarck! (1960), and The Wind of Change (1961).

Teen idol

Hemmings began to be known for playing young men, for example in The Painted Smile (1962) and Some People (1962). His first lead role was in the low budget teen musical Live It Up! (1963), then he had support roles for Michael Winner's The System (1964). After this, he starred in a sequel to Live It Up!, Be My Guest (1965) and in the same year in Two Left Feet with Michael Crawford.

Blowup and stardom

Hemmings luck changed when he was cast in the lead of Blowup (1966). It was directed by Michelangelo Antonioni, who detested the "Method" way of acting. He sought to find a fresh young face for the lead in the film. He found Hemmings, at the time acting in small stage theatre in London, although at their first meeting, Antonioni told Hemmings, "you look wrong. You're too young". Hemmings was offered the part of the protagonist, a London fashion photographer who accidentally photographs evidence of a murder, after Sean Connery turned the role down because Antonioni would not show him the full script, but only a seven-page treatment stored in a cigarette packet.

The resulting film was a critical and commercial sensation for MGM which financed it, and helped turn Hemmings and Vanessa Redgrave into stars. "I've been discovered half a dozen times," said Hemmings. "This time I think I've made it."

After Blowup Hemmings accepted an offer from Warner Bros to play Mordred in the big-budget film of the Broadway musical Camelot (1967).  He had a supporting part in the thriller Eye of the Devil (1966), playing the brother of Sharon Tate.  Hemmings was then cast as Louis Nolan in the big-budget epic The Charge of the Light Brigade (1968), which, like Camelot, was widely seen but failed to recoup its cost.

Around 1967, Hemmings was briefly considered for the role of Alex in a planned film version of Anthony Burgess's novel A Clockwork Orange (1962), which was to be based on a screen treatment by satirist Terry Southern and British photographer Michael Cooper. Cooper and the Rolling Stones were reportedly upset by the move and it was decided to return to the original plan in which Mick Jagger, the lead vocalist of the Rolling Stones, would play Alex, with the rest of the Stones as his droog gang; the production was shelved after Britain's chief censor, the Lord Chamberlain, indicated that he would not permit it to be made.

Hemmings co-starred with Richard Attenborough in a comedy, Only When I Larf (1968), then was the sole star of an anti-war film, The Long Day's Dying (1968). Both films flopped.  More financially successful was Barbarella (1968) in which Hemmings had a key role. He played the lead in two period films for MGM: a comedy, The Best House in London (1969), and the historical epic Alfred the Great (1969), in which Hemmings had the title role. Neither film did well at the box office, with Alfred the Great being a notable flop.

Hemmings was cast in further lead roles at the start of the 1970s : The Walking Stick (1970) with Samantha Eggar, for MGM; Fragment of Fear (1970), a thriller; and Unman, Wittering and Zigo (1971).  He went to Hollywood to play a supporting role in The Love Machine (1971). Back in Britain he starred in a horror film, Voices (1973).  He went to Spain to appear in Lola (1974), and in Britain supported Richard Harris in Juggernaut (1974).

Hemmings appeared in the Italian giallo film Profondo Rosso (also known as Deep Red or The Hatchet Murders) (1975) directed by Dario Argento. Back in England he supported Anthony Newley in Mister Quilp (1975).

Director
Hemmings first turned to directing with Running Scared (1972), an adaptation of an American novel by Gregory Macdonald for which Hemmings also co-wrote the script, resetting the story from Harvard to Cambridge University.  He directed the drama film The 14 (1973), which won the Silver Bear at the 23rd Berlin International Film Festival.  Later, after relocating to Hollywood, he directed a number of television films and series episodes.

Character actor
From this point on, Hemmings was really a supporting actor. In 1977 he appeared as Eddy in the film Islands in the Stream, an adaptation of Hemingway's novel of the same name, starring George C Scott.

He had support roles in The Squeeze (1977), The Prince and the Pauper (1977), The Heroin Busters (1977), The Disappearance (1977), Squadra antitruffa (1977), Blood Relatives (1978) and Power Play (1978).

Hemmings directed David Bowie and Marlene Dietrich in the drama film Schöner Gigolo, armer Gigolo (also known as Just a Gigolo) (1978). The film was poorly received, with Bowie describing it as "my 32 Elvis Presley films rolled into one".

He had a support role in Murder by Decree (1979).

Australia and New Zealand
Hemmings received an offer to play a supporting role in an Australian vampire film, Thirst. He starred in a TV film, Charlie Muffin then returned to Australia to feature in Harlequin.

Hemmings then received an offer from Ginnane to direct the Australian horror film The Survivor, based on James Herbert's 1976 novel of the same name, starring Robert Powell and Jenny Agutter. Hemmings directed Race for the Yankee Zephyr shot in New Zealand.

While in New Zealand Hemmings played roles in Prisoners and Beyond Reasonable Doubt.

Hollywood
Hemmings then relocated to Hollywood. He played supporting roles in Man, Woman and Child (1983) and Airwolf (1984).

He also worked extensively as a director of television programmes including the action-adventure drama series Quantum Leap (e.g., the series premiere); the crime series Magnum, P.I. (in which he also played characters in several episodes); and two action-adventure series The A-Team and Airwolf (in which he also played the role of Doctor Charles Henry Moffet, twisted creator of Airwolf, in the pilot and the second-season episode "Moffett's Ghost"a typographical error by the studio's titles unit). He once joked, "People thought I was dead. But I wasn't. I was just directing The A-Team."

Hemmings also directed the puzzle-contest video Money Hunt: The Mystery of the Missing Link (1984). He directed (and acted in) the television film The Key to Rebecca (1985), an adaptation of Ken Follett's 1980 novel of the same name. He also briefly served as a producer on the NBC crime-drama television series Stingray.

He directed the drama film Dark Horse (1992) and as an actor returned to the voyeuristic preoccupations of his Blowup character with a plum part as the Big Brother-esque villain in the season-three opener for the television horror anthology series Tales From the Crypt.

Later years
In later years, he had roles including appearing as Cassius in the historical epic film Gladiator (2000), with Russell Crowe, as well as appearing in the drama film Last Orders (2001) and the spy film Spy Game (2001). He appeared as Mr. Schermerhorn in the historical film Gangs of New York (2002), directed by Martin Scorsese.

His final screen appearances included the science-fiction action film, Equilibrium (2002), shortly before his death, as well the superhero film The League of Extraordinary Gentlemen (2003), with Sean Connery and as Frank Sinatra's attorney in the 2003 Australian film The Night We Called It a Day, a comedy based on true events. He also appeared in the horror film Blessed (2004) with Heather Graham, which was dedicated to him in his memory after a fatal heart attack while on set.

Recording career

In 1967, Hemmings recorded a pop single, "Back Street Mirror" (written by Gene Clark), and a studio album, David Hemmings Happens, in Los Angeles. The album featured instrumental backing by several members of the Byrds, and was produced by Byrds' mentor Jim Dickson.

In the 1970s, he was jointly credited with former Easybeats members Harry Vanda and George Young as a co-composer of the song "Pasadena". The original 1973 recording of this song –  the first Australian hit for singer John Paul Young – was produced by Simon Napier-Bell, in whose SNB Records label Hemmings was a partner at the time.

Hemmings also later provided the narration for Rick Wakeman's progressive-rock album Journey to the Centre of the Earth (1974) – an adaptation of Jules Verne's science-fiction novel A Journey to the Center of the Earth (1864) – which was recorded live.

He starred as Bertie Wooster in the short-lived Andrew Lloyd Webber musical, Jeeves (1975), for which an original cast album was released.

Autobiography
After his death his autobiography, Blow Up... and Other ExaggerationsThe Autobiography of David Hemmings, was published in 2004.

Personal life
He was married four times: to Genista Ouvry (1960–1967), actress Gayle Hunnicutt (1968–1975), Prudence de Casembroot (1976–1997), and Lucy Williams (2002 to his death). Hemmings met Hunnicutt while he was in America promoting Blowup, by which time his marriage to Ouvry was over. At their outdoor wedding, Henry Mancini conducted an orchestra and the Mamas and the Papas performed next to a swimming pool filled with doves dyed puce. Of his relationship with Hunnicutt, Hemmings remarked, "We were the poor man's Taylor and Burton". Their marriage ended when Hunnicutt discovered Hemmings' affairs with actress Samantha Eggar, his co-star in The Walking Stick (1970), and his secretary Prudence de Casembroot.

During his subsequent marriage to Prudence de Casembroot, Hemmings continued his infidelities with, among others, Tessa Dahl. Hemmings had six children; he and Ouvry had daughter Deborah, he and Hunnicutt had actor son Nolan, while he and de Casembroot had sons George, Edward and William and daughter Charlotte.

Hemmings was an active supporter of liberal causes, and spoke at a number of meetings on behalf of the UK's Liberal Party.

Death
Hemmings died in 2003 at age 62 of a heart attack, in Bucharest, Romania, on the film set of Blessed (working title: Samantha's Child) after he had performed his scenes for the day.

His funeral was held at St Peter's Church, in the hamlet of Blackland near Calne, Wiltshire, where he had resided in his final years. He was buried in the church's graveyard.

Filmography

 The Rainbow Jacket (1954)
 Saint Joan (1957) as Minor Role
 Five Clues to Fortune (1957) as Ken
 The Heart Within (1957) as Danny Willard
 No Trees in the Street (1959) as Kenny
 Men of Tomorrow (1959) as Ted
 In the Wake of a Stranger (1959) as Schoolboy
 Sink the Bismarck! (1960) as Seaman on Ark Royal
 The Wind of Change (1961) as Ginger
 Play It Cool (1962)
 The Painted Smile (1962) as Roy
 Some People (1962) as Bert
 West 11 (1963) as Bit Role
 Two Left Feet (1963) as Brian
 Live It Up! (1963) as Dave Martin
 The System (1964) as David
 Be My Guest (1965) as Dave Martin
 Out of the Unknown – The Counterfeit Man (1965) as Westcott
 Blowup (1966) as Thomas
 Camelot (1967) as Mordred
 Eye of the Devil (1967) as Christian de Caray
 The Charge of the Light Brigade (1968) as Captain Nolan
 Only When I Larf (1968) as Bob
 The Long Day's Dying (1968) as John
 Barbarella (1968) as Dildano
 The Best House in London (1969) as Benjamin Oakes / Walter Leybourne
 Alfred The Great (1969) as Alfred
 The Walking Stick (1970) as Leigh Hartley
 Fragment of Fear (1970) as Tim Brett
 Simon, Simon (1970) as Man in car with posters
 Unman, Wittering and Zigo (1971) as John Ebony
 The Love Machine (1971) as Jerry Nelson
 Voices (1973) as Robert
 Lola (1974) as Juan
 Juggernaut (1974) as Charlie Braddock
 Deep Red (1975) as Marcus Daly
 Mister Quilp (aka The Old Curiosity Shop; 1975) as Richard Swiveller
 Islands in the Stream (1977) as Eddy
 The Squeeze (1977) as Keith
 The Prince and the Pauper (US title Crossed Swords) (1977) as Hugh Hendon
 The Heroin Busters (1977) as Hamilton
 The Disappearance (1977) as Edward
 Squadra antitruffa (1977) as Robert Clayton
 Blood Relatives (1978) as Armstrong
 Power Play (1978) as Colonel Narriman
 Just a Gigolo (1978) as Captain Hermann Kraft
 Murder by Decree (1979) as Inspector Foxborough
 Thirst (1979) as Dr. Fraser
 Charlie Muffin (US title: A Deadly Game) (1979) as Charlie Muffin
 Harlequin (1980) as Nick Rast
 Dr. Jekyll & Mr. Hyde (1980) as Dr. Henry Jekyll / Mr. Edward Hyde
 Swan Lake (1981) as Rothbart (voice)
 Beyond Reasonable Doubt (1981) as Insp. Bruce Hutton
 Prisoners (1981) as Wilkens
 Man, Woman and Child (1983) as Gavin Wilson
 Airwolf (1984) (television film and two subsequent episodes) as Dr. Charles Henry Moffett
 Magnum, P.I. (1985/87) (two episodes) as Lord Smythe-White / Danny
 The A-Team (1983/1987) (one episode) as captain of the boat (episode 2 season 4)
 The Rainbow (1989) as Uncle Henry
 Tales from the Crypt, "Loved to Death" (1991) as Mr. Stronham
 Northern Exposure (1992) as Viktor Bobrov
 Kung Fu: The Legend Continues (1995) as Durham
 Gladiator (2000) as Cassius
 Last Orders (2001) as Lenny
 Spy Game (2001) as CIA Agent Harry Duncan
 Mean Machine (2001) as Governor
 Waking the Dead: "Deathwatch" (2002) (television episode in 2 parts) as Ex-DCI Malcolm Finlay
 Slap Shot 2: Breaking the Ice (2002) as Martin Fox
 Equilibrium (2002) as Proctor
 Gangs of New York (2002) as Mr. Schermerhorn
 The League of Extraordinary Gentlemen (2003) as Nigel
 The Night We Called It a Day (2003) (a.k.a. All the Way) as Mickey Rudin
 Blessed (2004) as Earl Sydney
 Romantik (2007) as Dr. Sadun

Director
 Running Scared (1972)
 The 14 (1973)
 Just a Gigolo (1978)
 Race for the Yankee Zephyr (1981)
 The Survivor (1981)
 A-Team (9 episodes) (1983/1987)
 The Key to Rebecca (1985)
 Down Delaware Road (1988)
 Dark Horse (1992)
 Passport to Murder (1993)
 Christmas Reunion (1994)
 Lone Justice: Showdown at Plum Creek (1996)

Bibliography
 Hemmings, David (2004). Blow Up... and Other ExaggerationsThe Autobiography of David Hemmings. Robson Books (London). .

See also

 List of British actors
 List of British film directors
 List of film producers
 List of singer-songwriters

References

External links

 
 
 
 
 
 
 Pulleine, Tim (5 December 2005). "David Hemmings – Gifted Actor, Director and Producer Who Successfully Outgrew His Iconic '60s Image in Antonioni's Blow Up". The Guardian

1941 births
2003 deaths
20th-century English male actors
20th-century English male singers
20th-century English singers
21st-century English male actors
21st-century English male singers
21st-century English singers
21st-century English male writers
Boy sopranos
Benjamin Britten
English autobiographers
English male child actors
English child singers
English male film actors
English film directors
English film producers
English male musical theatre actors
English pop singers
English male screenwriters
English male singer-songwriters
English male television actors
English television directors
English television producers
German-language film directors
Actors from Guildford
People educated at Glyn School
People educated at Alleyn's School
British expatriate male actors in the United States
20th-century English screenwriters
20th-century English businesspeople